Elections to City of York Council were held on 6 May 1999.  All 53 council seats in the city were up for election and the Labour Party kept overall control of the council.

Election result

Ward results

Acomb ward

 * Represented the Acomb ward of York City Council, 19861996,  and the Acomb ward of City of York Council, 19951999 
 † Represented the Foxwood ward of York City Council, 19791983

Beckfield ward

 * Represented the Beckfield ward of City of York Council, 19951999

Bishophill ward

 * Represented the Bishophill ward of York City Council, 19821996,  and the Bishophill ward of City of York Council, 19951999 
 † Represented the Bishophill ward of York City Council, 19871996,  and the Bishophill ward of City of York Council, 19951999

Bootham ward

 * Represented the Bootham ward of York City Council, 19731996,  the Bootham division of North Yorkshire County Council, 19731996,  and the Bootham ward of City of York Council, 19951999 
 † Represented the Bootham ward of York City Council, 19821996,  the Fishergate division of North Yorkshire County Council, 19851989,  and the Bootham ward of City of York Council, 19951999

Clifton ward

 * Represented the Bootham ward of York City Council, 19791996,  the Clifton division of North Yorkshire County Council, 19811996,  and the Clifton ward of City of York Council, 19951999 
 † Represented the Clifton ward of York City Council, 19941996,  and the Clifton ward of City of York Council, 19951999

Clifton Without ward
The parish of Clifton Without

 * Represented the Clifton Without ward of Ryedale District Council, 19911996,   and the Clifton Without ward of City of York Council, 19951999

Copmanthorpe ward
The parishes of Acaster Malbis, Bishopthorpe, and Copmanthorpe

Dunnington and Kexby ward
The parishes of Dunnington and Kexby

 * Represented the Dunnington ward of Selby District Council, 19791996,   and the Dunnington and Kexby ward of City of York Council, 19951999

Fishergate ward

 * Represented the Fishergate ward of York City Council, 19881996,  and the Fishergate ward of City of York Council, 19951999 
 † Represented the Fishergate division of North Yorkshire County Council, 19931996,  and the Fishergate ward of City of York Council, 19951999 
 ‡ Represented the Fishergate division of North Yorkshire County Council, 19891993

Foxwood ward

 * Represented the Westfield ward of York City Council, 19731979, the Foxwood ward of York City Council, 19791996,  the Westfield division of North Yorkshire County Council, 19731985, the Foxwood division of North Yorkshire County Council, 19851996,  and the Foxwood ward of City of York Council, 19951999 
 † Represented the Foxwood ward of York City Council, 19901996,  and the Foxwood ward of City of York Council, 19951999 
 ‡ Represented the Beckfield ward of York City Council, 19861996,  and the Beckfield ward of City of York Council, 19951999

Fulford ward
The parish of Fulford

 * Represented the Fulford ward of City of York Council, 19951999

Guildhall ward

 * Represented the Guildhall division of North Yorkshire County Council, 19851996,  and the Guildhall ward of City of York Council, 19951999 
 † Represented the Acomb ward of York City Council, 19791984, the Guildhall ward of York City Council, 19881996,  the Acomb division of North Yorkshire County Council, 19811989,  and the Guildhall ward of City of York Council, 19951999 
 ‡ Represented the Micklegate ward of York City Council, 19911996

Haxby ward
The parish of Haxby

 * Represented the Haxby North East ward of Ryedale District Council, 19911996,  the Haxby / Strensall division of North Yorkshire County Council, 19931996,  and the Haxby ward of City of York Council, 19951999 
 † Represented the Haxby / Wigginton division of North Yorkshire County Council, 19931996,  and the Haxby ward of City of York Council, 19951999

Heslington ward
The parish of Heslington

 * Represented the Heslington ward of Selby District Council, 19911996,  and the Heslington ward of City of York Council, 19951999

Heworth ward

 * Represented the Heworth division of North Yorkshire County Council, 19891993,  and the Heworth ward of City of York Council, 19951999 
 † Represented the Heworth ward of York City Council, 19801996,  and the Heworth ward of City of York Council, 19951999

Heworth Without ward
The parish of Heworth Without

 * Represented the Heworth Without ward of Ryedale District Council, 19731983, the Osbaldwick and Heworth ward of Ryedale District Council, 19831996,  and the Heworth Without ward of City of York Council, 19951999

Holgate ward

 * Represented the Holgate ward of City of York Council, 19951999 
 † Represented the Holgate ward of York City Council, 19921996,  and the Holgate ward of City of York Council, 19951999 
 ‡ Represented the Foxwood ward of York City Council, 19791988

Huntington and New Earswick ward
The parishes of Huntington and New Earswick

 * Represented the Huntington North division of North Yorkshire County Council, 19931996,  and the Huntington and New Earswick ward of City of York Council, 19951999

Knavesmire ward

 * Represented the Knavesmire ward of York City Council, 19841996,  and the Knavesmire ward of City of York Council, 19951999 
 † Represented the Knavesmire ward of York City Council, 19911996,  and the Knavesmire ward of City of York Council, 19951999

Micklegate ward

 * Represented the Micklegate ward of York City Council, 19731996,  and the Micklegate division of North Yorkshire County Council, 19931996 
 † Represented the Walmgate ward of York City Council, 19801988, and the Heworth ward of York City Council, 19901996,   and the Micklegate ward of City of York Council, 19951999

Monk ward

 * Represented the Monk ward of City of York Council, 19951999

Osbaldwick ward
The parish of Osbaldwick

 * Represented the Osbaldwick / Heworth division of North Yorkshire County Council, 19851996

Rawcliffe and Skelton ward
The parishes of Rawcliffe and Skelton

 * Represented the Rawcliffe division of North Yorkshire County Council, 19891996,  and the Rawcliffe and Skelton ward of City of York Council, 19951999

Strensall ward
The parishes of Earswick, Holtby, Murton, Stockton-on-the-Forest, and Strensall with Towthorpe

 * Represented the Skelton ward of Ryedale District Council, 19911996,  and the Strensall ward of City of York Council, 19961999 
 † Represented the Huntington North ward of Ryedale District Council, 19911996,  and the Strensall ward of City of York Council, 19951999

Upper Poppleton ward
The parishes of Askham Bryan, Askham Richard, Hessay, Nether Poppleton, Rufforth with Knapton, and Upper Poppleton

 * Represented the Upper Poppleton ward of City of York Council, 19951999

Walmgate ward

 * Represented the Walmgate ward of York City Council, 19731996,  and the Walmgate ward of City of York Council, 19951999 
 † Represented the Guildhall ward of York City Council, 19901996,   and the Walmgate division of North Yorkshire County Council, 19851996,  and the Walmgate ward of City of York Council, 19951999 
 ‡ Represented the Haxby North East ward of Ryedale District Council, 19831996,  and the Haxby ward of City of York Council, 19951999

Westfield ward

 * Represented the Westfield ward of York City Council, 19791996,  the Westfield division of North Yorkshire County Council, 19931996,  and the Westfield ward of City of York Council, 19951999 
 † Represented the Westfield ward of York City Council, 19941996 
 ‡ Represented the Acomb ward of York City Council, 19881996,  and the Westfield ward of City of York Council, 19951999

Wheldrake ward
The parishes of Deighton, Elvington, Naburn, and Wheldrake

Wigginton ward
The parish of Wigginton

 * Represented the Haxby and Wigginton ward of Ryedale District Council, 19791983, the Wigginton ward of Ryedale District Council, 19871996,  and the Wigginton ward of City of York Council, 19951999

References

1999 English local elections
1999
1990s in York